Musical freestyle can refer to:

Musical canine freestyle, performing synchronized routines with one's dog
Musical kur, equine dressage to music
Freestyle music, a form of dance-pop or electronic dance music
Freestyle rap